The 2007 Women's European Volleyball Championship was the 25th edition of the event, organised by Europe's governing volleyball body, the Confédération Européenne de Volleyball. It was hosted in Charleroi and Hasselt of Belgium and Luxembourg City of Luxembourg from 20 to 30 September 2007.

Participating teams

Format
The tournament was played in three different stages. In the first stage, the sixteen participants were divided in four groups (A, B, C and D) of four teams each. A single round-robin format was played within each group to determine the teams' group position; the three best teams of each group (total of 12 teams) progressed to the second stage. 

The second stage of the tournament consisted of two groups of six teams each. As the first stage match results amongst the teams which advanced to this stage also counted, the two groups had been predetermined, one group formed by groups A and C teams while the other was formed by groups B and D teams. In each of the two groups, the teams played once against every opponent they had not faced in the tournament (total of three matches each), adding that to the results obtained against the other two teams who also advanced from the first stage same group. The two group winners and two runners-up from this second stage advanced to the third stage.         

The third and final stage of the tournament was composed of the semifinals, third place match and final. Each of the semifinals was played between the winner and the runner-up of the same second stage group.

Pools composition

Squads

Venues
The tournament was played at three venues in three cities, of which two were in Belgium and one in Luxembourg. Group stages were held in Belgium and Luxembourg hosted the Final round.

Preliminary round

 All times are Central European Summer Time (UTC+02:00).

Pool A
venue: Spiroudome, Charleroi, Belgium

|}

|}

Pool B
venue: Sporthal Alverberg, Hasselt, Belgium

|}

|}

Pool C
venue: Spiroudome, Charleroi, Belgium

|}

|}

Pool D
venue: Sporthal Alverberg, Hasselt, Belgium

|}

|}

Playoff round

 All times are Central European Summer Time (UTC+02:00).

Pool E
venue: Spiroudome, Charleroi, Belgium

|}

|}
The following Preliminary round matches are also valid for the pool standings: 

|}

Pool F
venue: Sporthal Alverberg, Hasselt, Belgium

|}

|}
The following Preliminary round matches are also valid for the pool standings:

|}

Final round
venue: d'Coque, Luxembourg City, Luxembourg
 All times are Central European Summer Time (UTC+02:00).

Semifinals

|}

3rd place match

|}

Final

|}

Ranking and statistics

Final ranking

Individual awards
MVP: 
Best Scorer: 
Best Spiker: 
Best Blocker: 
Best Server: 
Best Libero: 
Best Setter: 
Best Receiver:

References
 Confédération Européenne de Volleyball (CEV)

External links
Official website
CEV Results
 Results at todor66.com

European Championship
V
Women's European Volleyball Championship, 2007
V
Women's European Volleyball Championships
September 2007 sports events in Europe
Women's volleyball in Belgium
Women's volleyball in Luxembourg
2007 in Belgian women's sport
Sports competitions in Luxembourg City
2000s in Luxembourg City